Tyler James Sturdevant (born December 20, 1985) is an American professional baseball pitcher who is currently a free agent. He made his Major League Baseball (MLB) debut in 2016 with the Tampa Bay Rays.

Career

Cleveland Indians
Sturdevant attended Chatfield Senior High School, in Littleton, Colorado, graduating in 2004. He played college baseball at New Mexico State University. He was drafted by the Cleveland Indians in the 27th round of the 2009 Major League Baseball draft.

Tampa Bay Rays
Sturdevant signed with the Tampa Bay Rays before the 2016 season. He was called up to the majors for the first time on May 22, 2016. He elected to become a free agent after the season.

Oakland Athletics
He signed a minor league contract with the Oakland Athletics in November 2016. He elected free agency on November 6, 2017.

References

External links

1985 births
Living people
Sportspeople from Littleton, Colorado
Baseball players from Colorado
Major League Baseball pitchers
Tampa Bay Rays players
New Mexico State Aggies baseball players
Mahoning Valley Scrappers players
Lake County Captains players
Kinston Indians players
Akron Aeros players
Columbus Clippers players
Phoenix Desert Dogs players
Carolina Mudcats players
Surprise Saguaros players
Criollos de Caguas players
Akron RubberDucks players
Águilas del Zulia players
American expatriate baseball players in Venezuela
Durham Bulls players
2017 World Baseball Classic players
Liga de Béisbol Profesional Roberto Clemente pitchers
Nashville Sounds players
Midland RockHounds players